Mehman Sayadov (November 21, 1972, Gyunashli, Basargechar – May 9, 1992, Nabilar, Shusha District, Azerbaijan) was the National Hero of Azerbaijan, and the warrior of the Karabakh war.

Biography 
Mehman Sayadov was born on 21 November 1972 in Guneshli village of Vardenis District. He was graduating from the seventh class of secondary school in this village when Armenians deported Azerbaijanis in 1988. After being deported that year, he moved with his family to the Samukh District.

In 1988 he was one of the most active participants of the Azerbaijan National Liberation Movement. When he was 18, he was drafted to the Soviet Army. At this time, the incidents in Nagorno Karabakh were deeply disturbed him. After serving six months in the Soviet Army, he returned home and went to the front line as a volunteer.

Military career 
Mehman Sayadov joined a self-defense battalion named "The Karabakh of Azerbaijan" and went to the front line as a volunteer on November 5, 1991. He showed courage and firmness in the battles around the villages of Kosalar and Nabilar of the Shusha District.  Mehman Sayadov was killed in the battle around the village of Nabilar on May 9, 1992.

Memorial 
He was posthumously awarded the title of "National Hero of Azerbaijan" by Presidential Decree No. 833 dated 7 June 1992. Despite all the attempts, his body could not be taken from the battlefield.

See also 
 First Nagorno-Karabakh War
 List of National Heroes of Azerbaijan

References

Sources 
Vugar Asgarov. Azərbaycanın Milli Qəhrəmanları (Yenidən işlənmiş II nəşr). Bakı: "Dərələyəz-M", 2010, səh. 254.

1972 births
1992 deaths
Azerbaijani military personnel
Azerbaijani military personnel of the Nagorno-Karabakh War
Azerbaijani military personnel killed in action
National Heroes of Azerbaijan